The 1981–82 Northern Premier League was the fourteenth season of the Northern Premier League, a regional football league in Northern England, the northern areas of the Midlands and North Wales. The season began on 15 August 1981 and concluded on 1 May 1982.

Overview
The League featured twenty-two clubs.

Team changes
The following club left the League at the end of the previous season:
Runcorn promoted to Alliance Premier League

The following club joined the League at the start of the season:
Bangor City relegated from Alliance Premier League (returning after a two year's absence)

League table

Results

Stadia and locations

Cup results

Challenge Cup

President's Cup

Northern Premier League Shield

Between Champions of NPL Premier Division and Winners of the NPL Cup.

FA Cup

None of the twenty-two Northern Premier League clubs reached the second round:

First Round

FA Trophy

None of the twenty-two Northern Premier League clubs reached the fourth round:

Third Round

End of the season
At the end of the fourteenth season of the Northern Premier League, Bangor City applied to join the Alliance Premier League and were successful.

Promotion and relegation
The following two clubs left the League at the end of the season:
Bangor City promoted to Alliance Premier League
Lancaster City relegated to North West Counties League Division One

The following two clubs joined the League the following season:
Chorley promoted from Cheshire County League Division One (returning after a ten year's absence)
Hyde United promoted from Cheshire County League Division One (returning after a twelve year's absence)

References

External links
 Northern Premier League official website
 Northern Premier League tables at RSSSF
 Football Club History Database

Northern Premier League seasons
6